General Cole may refer to:

Charles H. Cole (1871–1952), Massachusetts Volunteer Militia general
Eli K. Cole (1867–1929), U.S. Marine Corps major general
Eric Cole (1906–1992), British Army major general
Galbraith Lowry Cole (1772–1842), British Army general 
George Cole (British Army officer) (1911–1973), British Army lieutenant general
George M. Cole (1853–1933), U.S. Army major general
George W. Cole (1827–1875), Union Army brevet major general
John T. Cole (1895–1975), U.S. Army brigadier general
Jonathan Cole (British Army officer) (born 1967), British Army major general
Nelson D. Cole (1833–1899), U.S. Army brigadier general
Thomas F. Cole (general) (born 1928), U.S. Army major general
William E. Cole (1874–1953), U.S. Army major general

See also
Attorney General Cole (disambiguation)